New York Film Festival Downtown was a New York-based film festival founded by Tessa Hughes-Freeland and Ela Troyano in 1984.

Known for its independent and "positively avante-garde" programming, the festival came to prominence in the East Village art scene. The New York Film Festival Downtown ran for five years, ending in 1988.

1984
 Judgment Day (Directed by: Manuel Delanda)
 Between Two Fires (Directed by: Bradley Eros)
 Blind Love (Directed by: Aline Mare)
 Bargain Slide Show (Directed by: David Schmiddlapp)
 Confidential (Directed by: Joseph Nechvatal)
 Bored (Directed by: Karen Luna)
 Chant Chant Amour Amour (Directed by: Haoui Montaug)
 Sur Reel Selections (Directed by: Sur Rodney Sur)
 Soul City (Directed by: M. Henry Jones)
 Go go girl (Directed by: M. Henry Jones)
 Someplace in Nowhere (Directed by: Joe Coleman)
 Home Move of Warhol Shooting Unreleased Movie (Directed by: Taylor Mead)
 Blue Pleasure (Directed by: FrAnco Marinai)
 David Crocker as Venus (Directed by: Ela Troyano)
 Pompeii: New York Pt. 1: Pier Caresses (Directed by: Ivan Galietti)
 Slides (Directed by: Christof Kohlhofer)
 Electric Pencil Performance #13 (Directed by: Dragan Ilic)
 Show of Force - Blood Boy (Directed by: Richard Kern & Brian Moran)
 No Guilt (Directed by: Nick Zedd)
 Contortionist (Directed by: Greer Lankton)
 Bandits (Directed by: Joey Ahlbum)
 Invasion of the Amazons (Continued Erosion) (Directed by: Penelope Wehrli)
 Joker (Directed by: Tessa Hughes-Freeland)
 August 13th 1961 (Directed by: Kiki Smith)
 City Maze (Directed by: Jane Dickson)
 The Specialist (Directed by: Scott B.)
 The Deadly Art of Survival (Directed by: Charlie Ahearn)
 Not Quite Love (Directed by: David Schmiddlapp)
 The Ballad of Sexual Dependency (Directed by: Nan Goldin)
 Exotic Landlordism of Crab Lagoon (Directed by: Jack Smith)
 Dagmar Poisoned the Pizza (Directed by: Anthony Chase)
 Teddy Foot Beach Grov. (Directed by: Nile Southern & Phoebe Legere)
 Priapic Violations (Directed by: Uzi Parnes with Carmelita Tropicana)
 Poppo at 8BC (Directed by: Tessa Hughes-Freeland)
 Portrait of Glenn Branca, Symphony #4 (Directed by: Arlene Schloss)
 Kate Mannheim and Jack Smith (Directed by: Dan Ochiva)
 A Walled City Documentary (Directed by: David West)
 Mares (Directed by: Alex Steyermark)
 Excerpts from Bubble People (Directed by: Ela Troyano)
 This Object (Directed by: Jacob Burckhardt)

1985

 Slide Performance (Directed by: Stephen Holman & Torture Chorus)
 The Ballad of Sexual Dependency (Directed by: Nan Goldin)
 Pyrotechnics (Directed by: Erotic Psyche)
 The Outsiders (Directed by: Dan Ochiva)
 Fall In A Faint (Directed by: Sokhi Wagner)
 Last Nights (Directed by: Sandy Tate & Gretchen Bender)
 Spectre Woman - On the Road (Directed by: Ellen Fisher, Mary Schultz, Tone Blevins & John Van Wagner)
 Work At Nine (Directed by: Julius Klein)
 Frankie Teardrop (Directed by: Edit Deak & Walter Robinson)
 Spills & Thrills (Directed by: Sur Rodney Sur)
 The Agent (Directed by: Mary Bellis)
 A La Vueltecita (Directed by: Ileana Maria Montalvo)
 The Day Koch gets Electrocuted (Directed by: David Schmidlapp)
 Dead On My Arm (Directed by: Cassandra Stark)
 Worm Movie (Directed by: Lung Leg)
 Slight Show (Directed by: Christof Kohlhofer)
 Simonland (Directed by: Tommy Turner)
 Live Ammo (Directed by: Terry Stacey)
 Chett Grant: A Portrait of the Man (Directed by: Fabio P. Roberti for DirectArt Productions Ltd.)
 Thrust In Me (Directed by: Nick Zedd & Richard Kern)
 Submit To Me or From Sex to Death (Directed by: Richard Kern)
 Manhattan Love Suicides (Directed by: Richard Kern)
 Tender HB1 (Directed by: Dragan Ilic)
 It Don't Pay To Be An Honest Citizen (Directed by: Jacob Burckhardt)
 Pompeii New York, Part 1 (Directed by: Ivan Galietti)
 Asparagus (Directed by: Suzan Pitt)
 Excerpts From Apple, Heart , Daisy Film (Directed by: M. Henry Jones & Susan Tremblay)
 Ism Ism (Directed by: Manuel De Landa)
 Cyanide Time (Directed by: David West)
 White Rabbit (Directed by: Andy Somma)
 MasterRay (Directed by: Ruby Ray)
 Loisada Lusts (Directed by: Uzi Parnes & Ela Troyano)
 Stars & Stripes (Directed by: Uzi Parnes & Ela Troyano)
 Revenge of the Dearest (Directed by: Anthony Chase)
 Rhonda Goes To Hollywood (Directed by: Tessa Hughes-Freeland)
 Mime 2 Mind (Directed by: Arleen Schloss)
 Voyage To The Wall (Directed by: Johan Donner & Ulf Nilsson)
 Rome '78 (Directed by: James Nares)

1986
 A Presentation of 3D slides (Directed by: M. Henry Jones)
 Parade (Directed by: Joey Ahlbum)
 C'est la Guerre (Directed by: Karen Mandelbaum)
 Alive With Pleasure (Directed by: Anthony Chase & the Avenue A Ladies' Auxiliary)
 Demeter & Persephone (Directed by: Leslie Lowe)
 Witness Chamber (Directed by: Ruby Ray)
 8D (Directed by: Nile Southern)
 White Rabbit (Directed by: Andy Soma)
 Monsieur Albet's Kaleidoscope EROTICON (Directed by: Stephen Holman)
 Corrective Measures: Politically Speaking (Directed by: Peter Cramer)
 Titere (Directed by: Ileana Montalvo)
 Bath House (Directed by: Ira Abromowitz)
 I Ride a Pony Named Flame (Directed by: Peggy Ahwesh)
 Performance (Directed by: Julius Klein)
 A Suicide (Directed by: Richard Klemann)
 Vampire Terror Party (Directed by: David Wicked)
 Memorias De La Revolucion (Performance) (Directed by: Carmelita Tropicana)
 The Black Monster (Directed by: Lung Leg)
  Bad Blood for the Vampyr (Directed by: Lis-san Tibodo)
 Coney Island (Directed by: Max Henry)
 Parental Guidance Suggested (Performance) (Directed by: Amy Turner & Tommy Turner)
 You Killed Me First (Directed by: Richard Kern)
 Submit To Me (Directed by: Richard Kern)
 Go To Hell (Directed by: Nick Zedd)
 Kiss Me Goodbye (Directed by: Nick Zedd)
 Human Waste (Directed by: Mark Zero)
 The Deal (Directed by: Mad Max)
 Pus (Directed by: John Spencer)
 a place to beware (Directed by: David Schmidlapp)
 Mild Seven: Cowboy Stories (Directed by: Kembra Pfahler)
 Good Luvin' Guitar Man (Directed by: Direct Art Ltd.)
 Heterosexual Love (Directed by: Direct Art Ltd.)
 The Wages of Sin (Directed by: David Rutsala)
 Devil's In The Dish (Directed by: Jo Andres)
 The Girls Can't Help It (Directed by: Uzi Parnes)
 Police Sexuality (Directed by: Manuel De Landa)
 Black Cat Tea (Directed by: Marzy Quazar)
 Pure War (part two of Amor Amore) (Directed by: Erotic Psyche)
 Where Evil Dwells (Directed by: Tommy Turner & David Wojnarowicz)
 Rat Trap (Directed by: Tessa Hughes-Freeland & Tommy Turner)
 Wrecked on Cannibal Island (Directed by: Cassandra Stark)
 Dumb Blond (Directed by: Ela Troyano)
 Stone Age Lament (Directed by: Tony Caplan)
 Tattoo Suite (Directed by: R.S. Wolkstein)
 Fantasmagoria (Directed by: Richard Bruce Byron)

1987
 Elusive Butterfly (Directed by: Andy Soma)
 Dancenoise with Anthony Chase (Directed by: Dancenoise & Anthony Chase)
 Catwalk (Directed by: Sue Graef)
 Memento Mori (Directed by: Michael Brynntrup)
 Pending (Directed by: Alyson Mead)
 Rush (Directed by: Mary Patierno & Mo Angelus)
 Butter Film (Directed by: Kiki Smith)
 Un Pas Deux (Directed by: Cassandra Stark & Haldor Enard)
 You'll Get Yours (Directed by: Jonathan Quinn)
 Electramorphic (Directed by: Erotic Psyche)
 Whipoorwill, Whip-or-will, Whip-poor-will (Directed by: Carl George)
 The Escape (Directed by: Philly)
 Siegfried (Directed by: Jack Waters)
 Untitled (Directed by: Cheryl Dyer)
 The Invasion of Thunderbolt Pagoda (Directed by: Ira Cohen)
 Shadows (Directed by: Brad Taylor)
 Moxie (Directed by: Adrienne Altenhaus)
 Pay To Live (Directed by: Richard Klemann)
 Police State (Directed by: Nick Zedd)
 Bloodlust (Directed by: Michael Gabriele & Ghislaine Chantel Jourden)
 Astroturf (Directed by: Jourdan Schwartze & David Markey)
 Fingered (Directed by: Richard Kern)
 Death Valley '69 (Directed by: Richard Kern)
 Film/Performance (Directed by: Julius Klein)
 Marilyn (Directed by: Nile Southern)
 The Doorman (Directed by: Dee D. Bache)
 Berlin New York (Directed by: Penelope Wehrli)
 Getting Over Getting Over (Directed by: David Schmidlapp)
 Coney Island (Directed by: Peter Cramer)
 Fifth, Park and Madison (Directed by: Dragan Ilic)
 A presentation of 3D slides (Directed by: M.Henry Jones, Joey Ahlbum & Robert Munn)
 Nocturnes (Directed by: Leslie Lowe & Jack Waters)
 Film Performance (Directed by: Ellen Fisher)
 Perils (Directed by: Abigail Child)
 Bali 1930's (Directed by: Suzanne Pillsbury)
 A-B-City (Directed by: Dieter Hormel & Brigitte Buhler)
 Der Elvis (Directed by: Jon Moritsugu)
 Maneaters (Directed by: Uzi Parnes)
 Fire in my Belly (Directed by: David Wojnarowicz)
 Or Beautiful People (Directed by: David Wojnarowicz)
 Hollow Be Thy Name (working title) (Directed by: Tommy Turner)
 Craftmatic Dreamin (Directed by: Kembra Pfahler)
 Going Jane (Directed by: Tessa Hughes-Freeland)
 Blonde Voodoo (Directed by: Ela Troyano)

1988
 Flag (Directed by: Jonathan Quinn)
 Go-Go Girls  (Directed by: M.Henry Jones & Joey Ahlbum)
 Pachanga En Dos Medios (Directed by: Marian Soto)
 The Circle Game (Directed by: Andy Soma)
 Hollow Be Thy Name (Directed by: Tommy Turner)
 Son of Craftmatic Dreamin' 1988 Sequel (Directed by: Kembra Pfahler)
 Untitled (Directed by: Anthony Chase)
 Spectre Woman Chronicles- Involuntary Possession (Directed by: Spectre Woman)
 Trash/Mull  (Directed by: Lisa Laquer)
 Candela (Directed by: Carmelita Tropicana, Uzi Parnes & Ela Troyano)
 Betaville (Directed by: Alyce Wittenstein)
 Café Notre Y Sur (Directed by: Maria Victoria Maldonado)
 Family Jewels (Directed by: Leslie Lowe & Jack Waters)
 The Golden Bowl or Repression (Directed by: Chris Krauss)
 Wishes (Directed by: Alessandra Bergero)
 Welcome To The Jungle (Directed by: Mark Zero)
 Which Turn? (Directed by: Sandy Tait)
 Bloodbath (Directed by: Ghislaine Jourden)
 Submit To Me Now (Directed by: Richard Kern)
 Film from performance piece Lucid Possession (Directed by: Jo Andres)
 Maneaters 3 - Squalid Salad (Directed by: Uzi Parnes)
 Sleazy Rider (Directed by: Jon Moritsugu)
 Exploding Limo Show (Directed by: Nile Southern)
 Untitled (Directed by: Steve Gallagher)
 What I did this Summer (Directed by: John Whitehead)
 Plastered (Directed by: Lorraine Llamas)
 Frannie (Directed by: Adrienne Altenhaus)
 Mayhem (Directed by: Abigail Childs)
 900 Pounds (Directed by: Alan Abrams)
 Apartment Eight (Directed by: Matthew Harrison)
 Politics of Deed (Directed by: Cheryl Dyer)
 Perry (Directed by: Cheryl Dyer)

References

Film festivals in New York City
Experimental film festivals
Underground film festivals